The University Clinical Center of the Republika Srpska is a medical centre located in Banja Luka, Bosnia and Herzegovina. It serves as the main medical centre for both Banja Luka and Republika Srpska.

History
The University Clinical Center of the Republika Srpska was established in 1897. In August 2015, by the government decision its name was changed to University Clinical Center of the Republika Srpska. It is the largest hospital in Republika Srpska, an entity of Bosnia and Herzegovina. As of 2016, the Clinical Center has 1,243 available beds.

See also
 List of hospitals in Bosnia and Herzegovina

References

External links
 

Hospitals in Bosnia and Herzegovina
Hospitals established in 1897
1897 establishments in Austria-Hungary
Buildings and structures in Banja Luka